The Bulgari Hotel and Residences is a luxury hotel in Knightsbridge, London. When it opened in 2012, it was the most expensive hotel in London, and the penthouse apartment sold for $157 million.

Location
The hotel is in Knightsbridge, near The Knightsbridge Apartments, One Hyde Park and 10 Lancelot Place. It is close to Harrods and Hyde Park. When completed, it was the first 5-star hotel to be built in prime Central London in over 30 years.

History
The hotel was built by Sir Robert McAlpine from 2010 to 2012, in place of the former Normandie Hotel. It was dedicated in May 2012. It was designed by Antonio Citterio, Patricia Viel & Partners. It was built with Portland stones. There are ten floors up and six underground floors.

There are 85 rooms and suites. All the rooms are designed in the same manner. The main thematic design is silver. The ballroom, which has a silver chandelier, can be rented for wedding receptions. It is "eco-friendly"; for example, the rainwater is recycled for the toilets. There is also a garden on the roof, or "green roof", with bat boxes.

In 2013, it signed a two-year contract with the Royal Albert Hall to be referred to visitors as its preferred luxury hotel.

In 2017, Bulgari London Hotel Private Screening Room was named as one of the top private screening rooms in London by Ikon London Magazine.

It is owned by Marriott International, Inc.

References

Hotels in London
Hotel buildings completed in 2012
Knightsbridge
LVMH brands
Marriott International
2012 establishments in England